Yuri Nikolayevich Zhukov (22 January 1938 – 3 March 2023) was a Russian historian and researcher at the Institute of Russian History at the Russian Academy of Sciences. Zhukov published several books that cover Joseph Stalin, such as Renaissance of Stalin and Handbook of a Stalinist.

Historical views 
Zhukov argued that Stalin was not personally responsible for the Great Purge and shifted the blame onto subordinates of Stalin. According to Zhukov, Stalin had conducted liberal reforms in the Soviet Union and launched the purges against real threats to Soviet security. Zhukov has also argued that by assuming sole power, Stalin had "saved the country and the world" from Lev Kamenev, Leon Trotsky, and Grigory Zinoviev, for in Zhukov's view their revolutionary politics brought the Soviet Union into conflict with the world.

Reception 
In February 2006 Zhukov was cited and well-received in an article by British newspaper The Guardian. In September 2006, Russian historian Yuri Yemelianov, reviewing Zhukov's work "Different Stalin", praised the book and stated that "presenting a vast body of irrefutable facts Yuri Zhukov makes convincing conclusions which make Stalin look completely different from what he looked like in Khrushchev’s report and in the later fabrications of the Anti-Stalinist propaganda". In a 2011 article for World Affairs, Marek Jan Chodakiewicz and Tomasz Sommer listed Zhukov, among others, as an example of historians which have been embraced by "Stalin apologists". In a 2012 Literaturnaya Gazeta interview, historian Gennady Kostyrchenko stated that virtually all of Zhukov's most recent historical works have had the moral and political rehabilitation of Stalin as their overriding theme. Writing for Reason in 2013, journalist Cathy Young described Zhukov as a "pro-Stalin historian".

Works

References

External links 
 

1938 births
2023 deaths
Neo-Stalinists
People from Krasnogorsk, Moscow Oblast
20th-century Russian historians
21st-century Russian historians